Božanov is a municipality and village in Náchod District in the Hradec Králové Region of the Czech Republic. It has about 400 inhabitants.

Administrative parts

The hamlet of Studená Voda is an administrative part of Božanov.

Geography
Božanov lies in the Broumovsko Protected Landscape Area on the border with Poland.

Sights
There is the Baroque Church of Saint Mary Magdalene designed by architect Kilian Ignaz Dientzenhofer. It was built in 1735–1743.

References

Villages in Náchod District